Virginia Troiani (born 22 February 1996) is an Italian sprinter who competed at the 2022 World Athletics Championships.

Her two twin sister (Alexandra and Serena) also competed at professional level in track and field.

Career
She won two medals at the 2022 Mediterranean Games (bronze in 400 m and gold in relay).

Achievements

See also
 Italian national track relay team

References

External links
 

1996 births
Living people
Italian female sprinters
20th-century Italian women
21st-century Italian women